Asperugo procumbens, known as madwort or German madwort, is the single species in the monotypic plant genus Asperugo. This plant is native to Europe but has been introduced elsewhere, such as the northern half of North America.

References

External links 

USDA plants database
Jepson Manual Treatment

Boraginoideae
Monotypic asterid genera
Boraginaceae genera